is a Japanese superhero film released on January 18, 2014. It is the annual "VS Series" movie, a crossover between the current and most recent Super Sentai series' casts, Zyuden Sentai Kyoryuger and Tokumei Sentai Go-Busters. In addition, the cast of the upcoming series Ressha Sentai ToQger make cameo appearances in the film, as do cast members from prior series Kyōryū Sentai Zyuranger and Bakuryū Sentai Abaranger. Its footage was used for the Power Rangers Beast Morphers season 2 episodes "Finding Keepers", "Making Bad", and "Grid Connection".

Story
Alerted by Torin of an evil presence above the city, the Kyoryugers see a strange energy from the sky before a mysterious green-eyed Tyrannosaurus briefly appears with a warning that their friend could die. The Kyoryugers are then ambushed by a group of Zorima, Golem Soldiers, and Barmia Soldiers before an armored figure named Neo-Geilton arrives with a figure he has just kidnapped. Revealed to be Ryoga Hakua of the Bakuryū Sentai Abaranger team, he transforms and suddenly attacks the Kyoryugers. Luckily, the Go-Busters arrive and hold off Aba Red before Tyranno Ranger of the Kyōryū Sentai Zyuranger team turns the tide alongside his captor Neo-Grifforzar. After they and their teams retreat, Hiromu thanks Daigo for helping him and Gokai Red before they are ambushed by Enter. Enter explains that he and Escape have been resurrected as part of a Vaglass restoration program that has been activated in response to the evil force that Neo-Grifforzar and Neo-Geilton serve: Voldos, a being created from the combined malice of Dai Satan and Dezumozorlya that is targeting the dinosaur-themed Super Sentai teams to have their Dino Hope extracted and converted into Wicked Life Energy to complete his evolution.

With the Go-Busters and Beet J. Stag holding off the enemies, the Kyoryugers arrive at the site too late to save Ryouga and Geki in what is revealed to be a trap set for them, with Gabutyra defeated by Neo-Grifforzar and infused by Voldos's power. By the time the Go-Busters find them, the Kyoryugers have also been placed under Voldos's control as he sends them back in time to kill the dinosaurs. Upon encountering the dinosaurs, the Kyoryugers almost kill them when the green eyed Tyrannosaurus protecting them from an eruption breaks the spell as Daigo recognizes the dinosaur as Gabutyra in his original state. The Gabutyra of the past proceeds to explain to them the warning he told Daigo related to his future self who is dying from Voldos's influence and that only Daigo can save him with the power of Dino Hope. Elsewhere, with help from the Abarangers' Yukito Sanjyo using a specially made Super Sentai Zyudenchi, Yayoi creates a time portal to bring the Kyoryugers back to the present time.

Meanwhile, the Go-Busters and Kyoryu Silver mount a rescue mission to save Ryouga and Geki when they are kept back by the Deboth Knights and Luckyuro while Neo-Grifforzar and Neo-Geilton take their captives with them. However, the Kyoryugers arrive and fight a losing battle against the grunts while Ryouga and Geki make a mutual attempt to fight Escape before Daigo finds the dying Gabutyra. Luckily, upon being joined by Jay alongside Masato due to the activation of one-time anti-virus program, the reunited Go-Busters team drives off the Deboth Army while destroying the satellite stations as Daigo succeeds in restoring Gabutyra to life. Joined by the assembled Zyuranger and Abaranger teams, using the Abaranger and Zyuranger Zyudenchi to give Gabutyra support in replicas of Guardian Beast Tyrannosaurus and Burstosaur Tyranno to deal with the villains' giant reinforcements, the Kyoryugers transform and the gathered Dinosaur Super Sentai take out the grunts. After the main team obliterates Enter in his Dark Buster form, Kyoryu Gold destroys Escape while the Abarangers defeat Neo-Geilton. Regrouping with the Zyurangers, the Dinosaur Super Sentai all combine the Kentrospiker, Howling Cannon, and Dino Bomber into the Ultimate Howling Cannon to destroy Neo-Grifforzar.

However, Neo-Grifforzar contains the blast as he departs to space to sacrifice himself so the amassed energy can complete Voldos's evolution. Though the Kyoryugers form Raiden Kyoryuzin, with the Guardian Beast Tyrannosaurus and Burstosaur Tyranno replicas transforming into Daizyuzin and AbarenOh, the Dinosaur Super Sentai are powerless against Voldos. Luckily, having obtained the Go-Busters Zyudenchi from Masato before he fades back into data, Red Buster summons Tategami LiOh whose head is used in the Tategami Raiden Kyoryuzin formation so it, Daizyuzin, and AbarenOh can focus their powers to blast Voldos back into space. Later, after giving their goodbyes to the Gabutyra of the past, the Kyoryugers decide to join the Go-Busters in a victory meal. However, Neo-Geilton has survived and uses Messiah Card 13 to become Neo-Messiah to avenge his creator before finding himself quickly destroyed by the unorthodox Ressha Sentai ToQger team.

Cast
: 
: 
: 
: 
: 
: 
: 
: 
, : 
: 
: 
: 
: 
: 
: 
: 
: 
: 
: 
: 
: 
: 
: 
: 
: 
: 
: 
: 
: 
: 
: 
: 
: 
: 
: 
: 
: 
Kyoryuger Equipment Voice: 
ToQger Equipment Voice:

Theme song

Lyrics: Shoko Fujibayashi, Saburo Yatsude
Composition & Arrangement: Go Sakabe
Artist: Hideaki Takatori, Showgo Kamada

Reception
By February 2, 2014,  the film had grossed ¥321,358,736 (US$3,140,960) at the Japanese box office.

References

External links

Official website at Toei

2014 films
2010s Super Sentai films
Crossover tokusatsu films
Films scored by Toshihiko Sahashi